Rolling Quartz is a South Korean rock band that debuted in December 2020 under Rolling Star Entertainment.

History

2019-present: Formation and debut
Rolling Quartz formed as a five member rock group in August 2019. They were originally two separate bands, under the names "Rolling Girlz" and "Rose Quartz", but they merged into a single group, merging their names to be "Rolling Quartz". For the first year of their career, Rolling Quartz performed primarily in clubs, especially in the Hongdae region of Seoul. However, they turned to more heavily relying on their social media presence in 2020 because of the COVID-19 pandemic.

In June 2020, they featured on the single "Random" by the producing duo 015B.

Rolling Quartz officially debuted on December 30, 2020 with the single "Blaze", which was accompanied by the release of a music video. The music video was directed and produced by Zanybros. All of the members participated in the production of the song, including lyrics, composition, and arrangement.

On January 10, 2021, the band was part of a livestream event Ambitious Girls Rock 1 alongside other female Korean and Japanese rock bands, including Vincit, Velvet Sighs, and Brats. 
In January, Rolling Quartz released their single "Blaze" as a single album, which included the instrumental version of the track. In February, the band made their first music show appearance, making their debut on M Countdown.

In August, the band collaborated with AleXa, arranging a rock version of her single "Xtra", which the band performed with AleXa on MTV Asia.

In February 2022, the band released their first EP Fighting, which made it into the top 5 US rock albums chart on iTunes, the first Korean indie band to do so.

Members
 Arem - bassist
 Hyunjung (현정) - guitarist
 Iree (아이리) - guitarist
 Jayoung (자영) - vocalist
 Yeongeun (영은) - drummer

Discography

Extended plays

Single albums

Singles

Videography

Music videos

References 

Musical groups from Seoul
Musical quintets
Musical groups established in 2019
2019 establishments in South Korea
South Korean alternative rock groups
South Korean indie rock groups
South Korean hard rock musical groups
All-female bands